Compañero y Compañera is a Philippine television public affairs talk show broadcast by ABS-CBN, GMA Network and  Radio Philippines Network. It ran from 1997 to 2001.

Airing history

As a radio program

DZMM (1994-1997)
On June 24, 1994, Renato Cayetano, a lawyer and senior partner of the Ponce-Enrile, Cayetano, Bautista, Reyes law firm, often known as PECABAR, started hosting a regular segment for Relos Reports, a program hosted by Gel Santos-Relos on DZMM. This is when the idea for Compañero y Compañera was born. Cayetano and Relos spoke about the legal issues of the week's top news. Cayetano's appearance as a guest on the show also opened the stage for what would become one of his most enduring contributions: providing free legal assistance to listeners in need of information and guidance. The segment grew in popularity and eventually took up a significant daily portion of the program.

As a TV program

ABS-CBN (1997-1998)
Compañero y Compañera began to air as a TV current affairs program on ABS-CBN from 1997 to 1998. The show's format in its first season was more magazine-style, beginning with a 20-minute dramatization of a case/problem issue. Cayetano would next go over the laws that would apply in the given circumstance. Cayetano and Relos would host the public service segment of the one-hour show in the second half. The program changed to a more talk-interactive style with less reenactment around the conclusion of the first season. There was a panel of guests who spoke with Cayetano and Relos about the current legal topic. Family, criminal, and civil law issues and circumstances were the most often discussed subjects. Additionally, Cayetano was available for inquiries from the live studio audience, who may also receive free legal counsel. The public service segment of the show also included emails and letters from viewers. Tessie Tomas, an actress and comedian, took Relos' position when she left for a parental and educational leave of absence. The final episodes of the show before it shifted to the GMA Network were hosted by broadcaster Daniel Razon in place of Cayetano, who was running for the Senate in 1998.

GMA Network (1998-2000)
Compañero y Compañera, which replaced Public Life with Randy David, went to GMA Network in October 1998 after spending a total of four years on ABS-CBN as a radio-television program. As his co-hosts, radio-TV personalities Ali Sotto and Angelique Lazo joined Cayetano, who was elected to the Senate months after the change. On July 26, 2000, the program's run on GMA came to an end, and Imbestigador took its place.

RPN (2000-2001)
Compañero y Compañera moved to RPN in August 2000, with Nanette Medved serving as Cayetano's co-host. The network's run of the show lasted a year.

Hosts
 Renato Cayetano 
 Gel Santos-Relos 
 Tessie Tomas 
 Daniel Razon 
 Ted Failon 
 Ali Sotto 
 Angelique Lazo 
 Nanette Medved

References

External links
 

1997 Philippine television series debuts
2001 Philippine television series endings
ABS-CBN original programming
Filipino-language television shows
GMA Network original programming
Philippine television shows
Radio Philippines Network original programming